Mats Anders Green (born 6 April 1979) is a Swedish politician of the Moderate Party. He has been Member of the Riksdag since the 2014 general election, representing his home constituency Jönköping County. He served as Mayor of Jönköping from 2011 to 2014.

In the Riksdag, Green is a member of the Committee on Civil Affairs and a deputy member of the Committee on Defence. In May 2015 the Government appointed Green as the Riksdag's only representative to The Swedish Commission for Shoreland Protection and Management, which mission was completed by December 2015. On 10 October 2017, Green was appointed his party's spokesperson on housing, being further promoted to spokesperson on employment and integration in May 2019.

Green was elected member of the national executive board of the Moderate Party at the party congress in October 2019.

References 

Municipal commissioners of Sweden
People from Huskvarna
1979 births
Living people
Members of the Riksdag from the Moderate Party
Members of the Riksdag 2014–2018
Members of the Riksdag 2018–2022
Members of the Riksdag 2022–2026